The Institute of Administrative Management (IAM) is an awarding organisation and professional body for practising and aspiring administrative and business managers. It supports students and members across 58 countries worldwide.

Topics 
Administrative management is concerned with the following areas:

Systems
Human resources
Communication
Information technology
Facilities
Training and development
Finance

History
The IAM was formed in 1915 when a group of executives from the private and public sectors met at the London School of Economics with the intention of forming a self-development group aiming to share best practices in administrative management.

The IAM operates a number of branches across the UK, providing members with networking opportunities, as well as delivering qualifications which are recognised across England, Wales and Northern Ireland by Ofqual, DCELLS and CCEA respectively. IAM qualifications are delivered by around 250 IAM-accredited centres, offering campus-based and distance learning options to IAM students. In addition, the IAM offers independent study options to unattached students. The IAM has students working in business, commerce, industry, local and central government in the UK and abroad, for example in Singapore, Malaysia, Hong Kong, the Gulf, the West Indies and Southern Africa.

The IAM entered into liquidation and ceased trading on 20 November 2013. Industry Qualifications (IQ) announced the acquisition of its name and assets on 24 January 2014. Plans are in place to focus on re-establishing the IAM qualifications within IQ and re-engage with those that had been studying on IAM programmes. Students who were engaged in IAM award programmes will be able to complete their qualifications under IQ.

Membership
The IAM is the professional body for administrative and business managers. Members include administrators, personal assistants, virtual assistants, office managers, administrative managers as well as business leaders. There are currently approximately 17,000 members.

Membership levels and designations available from the IAM:
 Student
 Affiliate 
 Associate (AInstAM)
 Member (MInstAM)
 Fellow (FInstAM)
 Companion (CInstAM)

Current qualifications

QCF Qualifications
The IAM is accredited on the Qualifications and Credit Framework (QCF). They offer the following QCF qualifications.

Diplomas
 Level 4 Diploma in Business & Administration
 Level 4 Diploma in Business & Administrative Management
 Level 5 Diploma in Business & Administrative Management
 Level 5 Diploma in Leadership & Management
 Level 6 Diploma in Business & Administrative Management
 Level 6 Diploma in Business Management
 Level 6 Extended Diploma in Business & Administrative Management

Certificates
 Level 2 Certificate in Principles of Business & Administration 
 Level 3 Certificate in Principles of Business & Administration 
 Level 4 Certificate in Business & Administrative Management 
 Level 5 Certificate in Business & Administrative Management
 Level 5 Certificate in Governance, Leadership & Motivation

National Vocational Qualifications
 Level 2 NVQ Certificate in Business & Administration
 Level 3 NVQ Diploma in Business & Administration
 Level 4 NVQ Diploma in Business & Administration
 Level 5 NVQ Diploma in Management

Apprenticeships
 Level 2 Intermediate Apprenticeship
 Level 3 Advanced Apprenticeship
 Level 4 Higher Level Apprenticeship
 Level 5 Higher Level Apprenticeship

NQF Qualifications
The IAM offers the following National Qualifications Framework programme.
 Level 3 Certificate in Administrative Management

External links
 IAM website
 Catalogue of the IAM archives, held at the Modern Records Centre, University of Warwick

References

Administrative Management
Qualification awarding bodies in the United Kingdom
Human resource management associations